Mas'udiyah is a village in central Syria, administratively part of the Homs Governorate, located northeast of Homs. Nearby localities include subdistrict center Jubb al-Jarrah to the south and Barri Sharqi to the northwest. According to the Syria Central Bureau of Statistics (CBS), Mas'udiyah had a population of 1,755 in the 2004 census. Its inhabitants are predominantly Alawites.

References

Populated places in al-Mukharram District
Alawite communities in Syria